Denstone is a civil parish in the district of East Staffordshire, Staffordshire, England.  It contains 30 buildings that are recorded in the National Heritage List for England.  Of these, five are listed at Grade II*, the middle grade, and the others are at Grade II, the lowest grade.  The parish contains the village of Denstone and the surrounding countryside.  Most of the listed buildings are houses and associated structures, cottages, farmhouses and farm buildings.  All Saints Church in the village, designed by G. E. Street, is listed together with associated structures, also designed by Street.  In the parish is Denstone College, and structures associated with it are listed.  The other listed buildings include a triumphal arch and two lodges at one of the former entrances to Alton Towers, a milestone and three mileposts, a bridge, a Methodist chapel, and a village cross and drinking fountain.


Key

Buildings

References

Citations

Sources

Lists of listed buildings in Staffordshire